Justin Popović (6 April 1894 – 7 April 1979) was a Serbian Orthodox theologian, archimandrite of the Ćelije Monastery, Dostoyevsky scholar, writer, an advocate of anti-communism and a critic of the pragmatic church ecclesiastical life.

On 2 May 2010, he was canonized as a saint by the Holy Synod of the Serbian Orthodox Church. In English, his name is sometimes spelled as Iustin Popovich.

Early life
Popović was born to Spiridon (a sexton) and Anastasija Popović, in the southern Serbian town of Vranje, the day before the Feast of Annunciation (by the Julian Calendar), on 6 April 1894. At his baptism, he was given the name Blagoje, after the Feast of the Annunciation (Blagovest means Annunciation or Good News). He was born into a priestly family, as seven previous generations (not including his father Spiridon) of the Popovićs (Popović in Serbian actually means "family or a son of a priest") were headed by priests.

He completed the nine-year studies at the University of Belgrade's Faculty of Theology in 1914. In the early 20th century the School of St. Sava in Belgrade was renowned throughout the Orthodox world as a holy place of extreme asceticism as well as of a high quality of scholarship. Some of the well-known professors were the rector, Fr. Domentian; Professor Fr. Dositheus, later a bishop; Athanas Popović; and the ecclesiastical composer, Stevan Mokranjac. Still, one professor stood head and shoulders above the rest: the then hieromonk Nikolaj Velimirović, professor of philosophy and theology, the single most influential person in his life.

World War I
During the early part of World War I, in autumn of 1914, Blagoje served as a student nurse primarily in Shkodër, Niš and throughout Kosovo. Unfortunately, while in this capacity, he contracted typhus during the winter of 1914 and had to spend over a month in a hospital in Niš. On 8 January 1915, he resumed his duties sharing the destiny of the Serbian army from Peć to Skadar(during which one hundred thousand Serbian soldiers died). On January 1, 1916 he entered the monastic order in the Orthodox cathedral of Shkodër and took the name of St. Justin, after the great Christian philosopher and martyr for Christ, St. Justin the Philosopher.

Further studies

Russia

Shortly after becoming a monk, Justin, along with several other students traveled to Petrograd, Russia for a year-long study in the Orthodox Seminary there. It was here the young monk Justin first dedicated himself more fully to Orthodoxy and the monastic way of life. He learned of the great Russian ascetics: St. Anthony and Theodosius of the Caves in Kiev, St. Seraphim of Sarov, St. Sergius of Radonezh, St. John of Kronstadt and others.

Oxford
After his year's study and sojourn in Russia, Justin Popović entered the Theological School in Oxford, England at the prompting of his spiritual father Nikolaj. Justin studied theology in London in the period 1916-1926, but his doctoral thesis under the title "Filozofija i religija F. M. Dostojevskog" (The Philosophy and Religion of Fyodor Mikhailovich Dostoevsky) was not accepted due to its radical criticism of Western humanism, rationalism, Roman Catholicism, and anthropocentrism. It was subsequently printed in 1923 when Popović became the editor of the Orthodox journal The Christian Life. Together with his colleagues from the Oxford University he edited the periodical The Christian Life for twenty years.

Athens
In 1926 he was promoted to the title of the Doctor of Theology at the Faculty of Theology, University in Athens (his dissertation being "Problem ličnosti i saznanja po Sv. Makariju Egipatskom" -The Problem of Personality and Cognition According to St. Macarius of Egypt). For his course on the Lives of the Saints, Justin began to translate into Serbian the Lives of the Saints from the Greek, Syriac and Slavonic sources, as well as numerous minor works of the Fathers-homilies of John Chrysostom, Macarius, and Isaac the Syrian. He also wrote The Theory of Knowledge According to St. Isaac. 

From 1930 until 1932 after a short period as Professor in the Theological Academy of Ss. Cyril and Methodius in Prizren, he was an associate of Bishop Joseph (Cvijovich) of Bitola and the man tasked with reorganizing the Church of the Carpatho-Russians in Czechoslovakia. This area had seen an increase in those espousing Uniatism, where previously converted Christians of these regions started their conversion back into the Orthodox religion. 

Fate brought Nikolaj Velimirović, John Maximovich of Shanghai and San Francisco and Popović together in Bitola. The young Maximovich (a Russian of Serbian ancestry) was the assistant to Fr. Justin at the theological seminary there, while the Bishop of Ohrid was Nikolaj Velimirović.

Belgrade
Popović was chosen, in 1934, as Professor of Dogmatics at the Theological Faculty of St. Sava in Belgrade. As the professor at the University of Belgrade he was one of the founders (1938) of the Serbian Philosophical Society along with a number of noted Belgrade intellectuals, including Branislav Petronijević, Toma Živanović (1884–1971), Miloš Đurić (1892–1967), Prvoš Slankamenac, Vladimir Dvorniković, Jelisaveta Branković, Zagorka Mićić, Kajica Milanov, Nikola Popović and others.

He was also the professor of Dogmatics at the Faculty of Orthodox Theology of the University of Belgrade from 1934 until 1945, until World War II. In 1945, with the establishment of the communist state and state atheism, Father Justin's anti-communism and efforts to convert others to Christianity had little place.

The Communist regime
After World War II, Popović was considered ineligible by the Communist party to continue as a professor at the seminary. Together with a few fellow professors, he was ousted from the Faculty in 1945. Popović spent 31 years in the Ćelije Monastery under the continuous surveillance of the Communist Party police. The Communists limited his public appearances within monastic confines. While Bishop Nikolaj Velimirović was never allowed to return to Serbia and Yugoslavia after his deportation in the Dachau concentration camp, Popović was allowed to actively participate in the organization of the Serbian Orthodox Church. This is perhaps because unlike Velimirović, Popović was not a bishop but a hieromonk. 

A devoted monk and philosopher of the Eastern Orthodox theology, Justin Popović was a great critic of ecumenism, providing it was inclined towards relativization of God's Truth. (John Meyendorff, professor of the Academy of St. Vladimir now in Scarsdale, New York (associated with Columbia University) - and every bit as much a critic of the "Catholic novelties" and the Pope's anti-Christianity. Until the end of his life Father Justin was a dedicated creator, and it is no wonder that his work is considered as a great contribution to the Orthodox theology and he himself as the secret conscience of the Serbian Church and the entire martyr's Orthodox religion (according to John N. Karmiris, the Greek academician).His example has been invoked by the Church of Greece (in the strict sense)'s Synod banning prayers with members of other Christian denominations.

Fr. Justin died the day after his birthday, on the day of the Feast of the Annunciation (March 25 by the Julian Calendar).

Legacy

Porfirije, Serbian Patriarch stated that he is one of the three most notable Serb theologians to be recognized internationally.

Works
 The Philosophy and Religion of F.M. Dostoevsky (1923),
 Dogmatics of the Orthodox Church, I-III (1932, 1935, 1980),
 The Progress in the Death Mill (1933),
 The Foundations of Theology (1939)
 Dostoevsky on Europe and Slavism (1940),
 Philosophical Abysses (1957),
 The Man and the God-Man (1969 in the Greek language),
 Hagiographies of the Saints, I-XII (1972–1977),
 The Orthodox Church and Ecumenism (1974, in the Greek and Serbian languages, 2001, in English, Lazarica Press UK)
 Praznične besede
 Pashalne besede
 Nedeljne besede
 Svetosavlje kao filozofija života
 Put Bogopoznanja
 Setve i žetve
 Druge besede
 Akatisti
 Tumačenje Svetog Jevanđelja po Mateju
 Tumačenje Svetog Jevanđelja po Jovanu
 Tumačenje poslanica Svetog Jovana Bogoslova
 Tumačenje poslanica prve i druge Korinićanima Svetog apostola Pavla
 Tumačenje poslanice Efescima
 Tumačenje poslanice Filipljanima i Kalošanima Svetog apostola Pavla
 Tumačenje poslanice Galatima I-II
 Tumačenje poslanice Solunjanima Svetog apostola Pavla

References

External links
 Perfect God and Perfect Man
 How to read the Bible and Why
 The Inward Mission of the Church
 The Attributes of the Church
 Homily on the Feast of the Beheading of St John, the Glorious Prophet, Forerunner and Baptist of the Lord
 Житие Св. Саввы Life of St. Sava (in Russian language)
 On Summoning of the Great Council Of the Orthodox Church
 'A Doe in Paradise Lost – Confession of a Doe'
 Papism as the Oldest Protestantism.
Orthodox Reading of Martin Luther: Protestantism as a Pan-heresy according to St Justin Popović

1894 births
1979 deaths
People from Vranje
People from the Kingdom of Serbia
Members of the Serbian Orthodox Church
Eastern Orthodox Christians from Serbia
Eastern Orthodox theologians
Serbian saints of the Eastern Orthodox Church
Serbian theologians
Serbian anti-communists
20th-century Christian saints
Christian hagiographers
Archimandrites
Eastern Orthodox philosophers
Patristic scholars
Fyodor Dostoyevsky scholars
University of Belgrade Faculty of Orthodox Theology alumni